Joseph Hunter (24 December 1875 – 24 July 1935) was a politician in the United Kingdom, and member of parliament (MP) from 1929 until his death.

In 1927 he had taken up a new post as Director of the Liberal Campaign Department centrally, a pivotal position during
the run-up to the 1929 general election campaign when he was one of the party's national organisers.

At the 1929 general election, in his first parliamentary candidacy, he stood as the Liberal Party candidate for Dumfriesshire, winning the seat from the Conservative MP John Charteris.  Hunter was re-elected in 1931 as a Liberal, but when the party split later that year over participation in the Conservative-dominated National Government, he joined the breakaway Liberal National Party.

Hunter died in office in July 1935, aged 59.

References

External links 
 

1875 births
1935 deaths
Scottish Liberal Party MPs
National Liberal Party (UK, 1931) politicians
UK MPs 1929–1931
UK MPs 1931–1935